Patience for the Waiting (Special Edition Acoustic EP) is an EP by American singer-songwriter and musician Jason Reeves.

Background
Reeves began work on an EP while co-writing sessions with Colbie Caillat for her second album, Breakthrough, as well as writing sessions with other artists.  He did more frequent bouts of touring, including a May 2009 Vespa-sponsored "green tour" with Brendan James and Amber Rubarth, during which they toured the California Coast on Vespa scooters while focusing on environmental friendliness.  Near the end of 2009, the EP was released by Warner Bros. Records.

Track listing

2009 EPs
Warner Records EPs
Jason Reeves (songwriter) EPs